Juan Vita (born 11 May 1987) is an Argentine football manager and former player who played as a midfielder. He is the current manager of Bolivian club Real Tomayapo.

Playing career
Vita began his career at Club Lácar, joining River Plate's youth ranks at the age of 13. During Vita's senior career, he played for Alvarado and Deportivo Morón, before retiring at the age of 22 to focus on coaching.

Managerial career
In 2014, Vita was named interim manager of Argentinian club Fénix. In 2019, after working in the youth sides of Banfield, he moved to Panama to manage Costa del Este.

Vita led the club to second place in Panama's 2019 Apertura. After being named manager of the year, he resigned from the club, and was named mananger of the Nicaragua national team in August 2020.

Sacked by Nicaragua on 2 March 2022, Vita was presented at Costa Rican side Guanacasteca on 7 June 2022. He was dismissed on 23 September, with the club in the last position of their group. 

On 15 March 2023, Vita switched teams and countries again, after being appointed in charge of Real Tomayapo in Bolivia.

References

External links

1987 births
Living people
Argentine footballers
Association football midfielders
Club Atlético Alvarado players
Deportivo Morón footballers
Nicaragua national football team managers
Argentine expatriate sportspeople in Panama
Argentine expatriate sportspeople in Nicaragua
Argentine football managers
Argentine expatriate football managers
Sportspeople from Mar del Plata
C.D. Real Tomayapo managers
Argentine expatriate sportspeople in Costa Rica
Expatriate football managers in Costa Rica
Argentine expatriate sportspeople in Bolivia
Expatriate football managers in Bolivia